The 2016 GP2 Series season was the fiftieth season of the second-tier of Formula One feeder championship and also twelfth and final season under the GP2 Series moniker, a motor racing feeder series that was run in support of the 2016 FIA Formula One World Championship. It was also originally scheduled to be the final season for the Dallara GP2/11 chassis that was introduced in 2011 and the Mecachrome 4.0 litre V8 normally-aspirated engine package that débuted in the maiden season of the series in 2005 before a brand new chassis and engine package was introduced for 2017, however due to another cost-cutting, the series announced it would keep the current chassis and engine package for one more season.

ART Grand Prix started the season as the defending teams' champions after securing the title–their fourth in the championship–at the series' second visit to the Bahrain International Circuit in 2015. Prema Racing won the Teams' championship, their first in the series and first attempt, while Pierre Gasly won the Drivers' championship.

Pierre Gasly took 4 race wins and the Championship. The most races were won by Gasly’s teammate Antonio Giovinazzi, who took 5 victories, Sergey Sirotkin took victories at Mogyoród in the sprint race, and in Hockenheim - he took pole position and won the race. Alex Lynn got 3 sprint races wins, Racing Engineering drivers Jordan King and Norman Nato took 2 race wins each, and Luca Ghiotto, Artem Markelov, Mitch Evans and Nobuharu Matsushita each got 1 race win.

Teams and drivers

Team changes
 Lazarus left the series at the end of the 2015 season, with their place taken by Prema Racing.
 Hilmer Motorsport left the series at the end of the 2015 season. As no replacement team could be found, the grid was left at twenty-two cars.
Status Grand Prix also left the series before the 2016 season due to not being able to find any well-budgeted drivers and also lack of sponsorship for their second season. With the demise of the team, there were no number #16 and #17 cars on the grid.

Driver changes
Changing teams
Sergio Canamasas, who raced for MP Motorsport, Hilmer Motorsport and Daiko Team Lazarus in 2015, switched to Carlin.
Mitch Evans and Sean Gelael, who drove for Russian Time and Carlin respectively in 2015, moved to Campos Racing.
Pierre Gasly, who spent the 2015 season with DAMS, moved to newcomers Prema Racing.
Nicholas Latifi, who took part in three rounds of the 2015 season with MP Motorsport, switched to a full-time seat with DAMS.
Gustav Malja, who raced for Trident and Rapax in 2015, switched Formula Renault 3.5 Series to race full-time with Rapax.
Raffaele Marciello, who raced for Trident in 2015, moved to Russian Time.
Norman Nato, who raced for Arden International in 2015, switched to Racing Engineering.
Arthur Pic, who raced for Campos in 2014 and 2015, switched to Rapax.
Oliver Rowland, who previously raced part-time for MP Motorsport and Status Grand Prix, is contesting the full season with MP Motorsport, with backing from Renault.
Sergey Sirotkin, who finished third in 2015, moved from Rapax to defending champions ART Grand Prix.

Entering GP2
2015 Formula Renault 3.5 Series competitor Philo Paz Armand joined the series with Trident.
GP3 Series race winner Jimmy Eriksson made his series début with Arden International.
2015 GP3 runner-up Luca Ghiotto graduated to the series with Trident.
2015 European Formula 3 runner-up Antonio Giovinazzi made his début in the series with Prema Racing.
Nabil Jeffri joined the series with Arden International.
Marvin Kirchhöfer, who placed third in the 2014 and 2015 GP3 Series joined the series with Carlin.

Leaving GP2
 Nathanaël Berthon left Lazarus and the series to join the FIA World Endurance Championship with G-Drive Racing.
 Rene Binder left MP Motorsport to join Lotus in Formula V8 3.5 Series.
 Rio Haryanto left Campos Racing and the series to join Formula One team Manor Racing.
  André Negrão and Dean Stoneman left Arden and Carlin and the series to join the Indy Lights with Schmidt Peterson Motorsports and Andretti Autosport.
 Richie Stanaway and Marco Sørensen, who raced for Status Grand Prix and Carlin, left to join the FIA World Endurance Championship with Aston Martin Racing.
 2015 season champion Stoffel Vandoorne left the series as the reigning champion is not permitted to continue competing in the series. He joined the Super Formula with Docomo Team Dandelion Racing.

Mid-season changes
 ART Grand Prix driver Nobuharu Matsushita was suspended for the fourth round of the season in Austria due to erratic driving at the previous event in Baku. He was replaced by René Binder. Binder later joined Carlin, replacing Sergio Canamasas.

Calendar
On 4 March 2016, the full calendar was revealed with eleven rounds taking place.

Calendar changes
 The series returned to the Hockenheimring in support of the German Grand Prix, and the Sepang International Circuit.
 With the return to Germany, the second Bahrain round—which had filled in as a replacement event in 2015—was removed from the calendar.
 The rounds at the Bahrain International Circuit and the Sochi Autodrom were discontinued after the Bahrain and Russian Grands Prix were brought forward to the start of the Formula One season.
 The series made its début at the Baku City Circuit in support of the returning European Grand Prix.

Results and standings

Season summary

Scoring system
Points were awarded to the top 10 classified finishers in the Feature race, and to the top 8 classified finishers in the Sprint race. The pole-sitter in the feature race also received four points, and two points were given to the driver who set the fastest lap inside the top ten in both the feature and sprint races. No extra points were awarded to the pole-sitter in the sprint race.

Feature race points

Sprint race points
Points were awarded to the top 8 classified finishers.

Drivers' championship

Notes:
† — Drivers did not finish the race, but were classified as they completed over 90% of the race distance.

Teams' championship

Notes:
† — Drivers did not finish the race, but were classified as they completed over 90% of the race distance.

Notes

References

External links
GP2 Series official website

GP2 Series
GP2 Series seasons
GP2 Series